Habang Panahon is a studio album by Filipino singer-actress Nora Aunor, released in 2009 by HIFI Productions in the United States of America in CD Form and could be download through iTunes and other digital download stores.  The album contains some of the original Filipino compositions by Bodjie Dasig and Odette Quesada.  The album contains 10 original tracks among them is the "Habang Panahon" which is the carrier single of the album.

Background
After more than a decade, Aunor released a new album which was entirely recorded in the US, this is the time when Aunor was in hiatus for 8 years. The album was recorded before she lost her singing voice due to a cosmetic surgery.

Track listing

Note"
 Track number 3 was also recorded by Nina for her Stay Alive (album) which was released in 2011.

Album credits

Executive Producers
 HIFI Productions, LLC

Producers
 Bodjie Dasig
 Odette Quesada

Associate Producer
 Antonio Vizmonte

Arranged by
 Bodgie Dasig

Recorded at
 NicNak Sound Studios

Special Guest
 Ner de Leon (Sax Solo on Kailan and Friends)

See also
 Nora Aunor discography

References 

Nora Aunor albums
2009 albums